2MASS J19383260+4603591 (commonly abbreviated to 2M J1938+4603, also known as Kepler-451) is a binary star system with at least one known planet, Kepler-451b. The system comprises two stars, a pulsating subdwarf B star as well as a small red dwarf star.

Planetary system
It has at least one confirmed exoplanet, Kepler-451b, discovered in 2015 by the Kepler spacecraft. The discovery was disputed in 2020, but in 2022 confirmation of Kepler-451b and the discovery of two additional planets was announced.

References

Binary stars
M-type main-sequence stars
B-type subdwarfs
J19383260+4603591
Planetary systems with three confirmed planets
Cygnus (constellation)